The following is a list of political parties registered at the Ministry of Interior, Spain, from  1976–2002.

Note that:
 The Ministry does not appear to remove registrations if parties become inactive or are dissolved, and many of the groups no longer exist. 
 Some of the groups were actually electoral alliances formed to contest a specific election. 
 Some of the groups are regional affiliates or branches of a national party. 
 Some of the organizations are actually the youth wings of larger political parties.
 Parties are listed by Spanish name, English name, by city, and in chronological order.

Parties from Madrid Province

Falange Española de las J.O.N.S., Madrid, 1974-08-04
Nueva Izquierda Nacional (New National Left), Madrid, 1974-08-04
Partido de Acción Nacional (National Action Party), Madrid, 1976-10-10
Centro Popular (Popular Centre), Madrid, 1976-11-02
More

Parties from Barcelona Province
Unió Catalana (Catalan Union),  Barcelona, 1976-10-07
Alianza del Trabajo Nacional Sindicalista (Alliance of National Syndicalist Labour), Barcelona, 1976-12-28
Democracia Social Cristiana de Catalunya (Christian Social Democracy of Catalonia), Barcelona, 1977-02-09
Convergència Democràtica de Catalunya (Democratic Convergence of Catalonia), Barcelona, 1977-02-23
More

Parties from Tarragona Province
Partido Social Regionalista (Unión Institucional) (Regionalist Social Party (Institutional Union), Ulldecona, 1976-10-04
Unió de Progrés Municipal, Tarragona, 1983-03-18
Unión de los Pueblos del Ebro, Tortosa, 1990-08-13
Forum Salou, Salou, 1990-12-14
Camp-Redo Poble, Tortosa, 1991-02-18
More

Parties from Valencia Province
Partido  (Labour Party), Valencia, 1976-10-04
Partit Socialista Valencia-PSOE (Valencian Socialist Party-PSOE), Valencia, 1977-03-03
Unió Democrática del País Valencià (Democratic Union of the Valencian Country), Valencia, 1977-03-03
Partido Social Democráta del País Valenciano (Social Democratic Party of the Valencian Country), Valencia, 1977-03-07

More

Parties from Cadiz Province
Unión Regional Andaluza (Andalusian Regional Union), Cadiz, 1977-02-09
Democracia Cristiana Andaluza (Andalusian Christian Democracy), Cadiz, 1977-11-08
Unión Social Democráta de Andalucía (Social Democratic Union of Andalusia), Puerto Real, 1977-11-22
Partido Acción Democrática de Andalucía (Democratic Action Party of Andalusia), San Fernando, 1982-08-18

More

Parties from Santa Cruz de Tenerife Province
Partido Popular Canario (Canarian People's Party), Santa Cruz de Tenerife, 1977-03-07
Asociación Social Democráta Canaria (Canarian Social Democratic Association), Santa Cruz de Tenerife, 1977-04-29
Partido Social Democráta de la Palma, Gomera y Hierro (Social Democratic Party of La Palma, Gomera and Hierro), Los Llanos de Aridane, 1977-04-29
Partido Socialdemócrata de Tenerife (Social Democratic Party of Tenerife), Santa Cruz de Tenerife, 1977-04-29

More

Parties from Palencia Province 
Partido Social Democráta de Castilla y León (Social Democratic Party of Castile-León), Palencia, 1977-03-07
Unidad Comunera Castellana (Castillan Comunero Unity), Fromista, 1983-02-14
Agrupación Palentina Popular, Palencia, 1991-03-11
Cives, Velilla del Río Carrión, 2000-01-31

Parties from Asturias Province
Unidad Regionalista Asturiana (Asturian Regionalist Unity), Oviedo, 1977-10-05
Partido Social-Cristiano de Asturias (Social-Christian Party of Asturias), Oviedo, 1979-01-11
Conceyu Nacionalista Astur (Asturian Nationalist Council), Mieres, 1979-01-19
Partido Socialista de Asturias (Socialist Party of Asturias), Oviedo, 1979-07-30

More

Parties from Albacete Province
Veinte de Noviembre (20 November), *Viveros, 1977-03-10
Democratic Action Party of Castile-La Mancha, Albacete, 1982-08-31
Partido Regionalista Manchego (Manchean Regionalist Party), Albacete, 1983-01-15
Agrupación Provincial Independiente de Albacete, Albacete, 1983-03-23
Alternativa Caudetana, *Caudete, 1995-02-14
Agrupación Independiente de Isso, *Hellin, 1995-03-10
Bloque Independiente de Carcelén, *Carcelén, 1998-11-24
Partido Independiente de Hellin, Hellin, 1999-04-12
Partido Independiente por Albacete, *La Gineta, 1999-10-20
Alternativa Hellinera, Hellin, 2000-07-06
Partido Federal, Caudete, 2002-09-25
Unidad Hellinera, Hellin, 2002-11-21

Parties from Guadalajara Province
Comunidad de las Tierras de Sigüenza, *Sigüenza, 1987-04-28
Partido Regionalista de Guadalajara, Guadalajara, 1988-01-11
Agrupación Vecinal Independiente Caraquiz, *Uceda, 1994-07-20
Plataforma de Autónomos Independientes, Guadalajara, 1994-12-16
Unión de Independientes de Guadalajara, Guadalajara, 1995-03-31
Partido de la Unidad de Alcocer, *Alcocer, 1999-04-12
Democracia Municipal - Lista Alternativa, Guadalajara, 1999-04-13

Parties from Zaragoza Province
Partido Social Democráta Aragonés (Aragonese Social Democratic Party),  Zaragoza, 1977-03-07
Democracia Cristiana Aragonesa (Aragonese Christian Democracy), Zaragosa, 1977-03-10
Partido Socialista de Aragón (Socialist Party of Aragon), Zaragoza, 1977-03-21
Partido Aragonés (Aragonese Party), Zaragoza, 1978-02-03
More

See also
 List of political parties in Spain
 Politics of Spain

Geog
Political parties